Harriet Bennett Strandberg (born Harriet Elizabeth Bennett; April 28, 1914 – January 9, 1991) was an American artist. She is known for scientific art such as appeared in the William Beebe monograph of deep-sea dragonfish for the New York Zoological Society Zoologica. She worked in a variety of media such as Oil Painting, Ink and Pencil Drawing, Etching, Paper folding, Japanese ink brush, Silk Screen, Photography, Oil and Soft Pastels, and Egg folk art ( Ukrainian wax resist ).

Born in Glens Falls, New York, Harriet graduated from Cornell in 1936, continued to study art, and worked at New York Zoological Society. She was initiated into Alpha Alpha Gamma - National Fraternity of Women in Architecture and its Allied Arts.

In the 1939 Annual report of the New York Zoological society William Beebe, Director of Tropical Research, wrote:
″ Miss Bennett has given her entire time to the Department as artist, both in the Zoological Park laboratory and in Bermuda. She has completed upwards of 193 drawings, of which seventy-seven appeared in the monograph of deep-sea dragonfish. ″

The naturalist William Beebe, was her cousin, and had influence on her appreciation of science and nature along with technical art; as did her father Harry Bennett who graduated from Princeton University and worked as civil engineer and as forester for paper industry.
In 1947 Harriet married the scientist Malcom W. P. Strandberg, who became a physics professor at MIT.

She was influenced by woodcut engraver and friend Elfriede Abbe, and also followed other artists such as Clare Leighton in the 1930s.
Her mother Elizabeth Chandler Clark, and grandmother Abby Rogers Clark, both had an impact on Harriet's appreciation of the arts.

Art Timeline 

1931 Glens Falls Academy graduated with First Honors, included Drawing and Art 
1936 Cornell University, graduated with Bachelor of Arts, majored in sciences and art, member of Pi Beta Phi sorority
1937 Cornell post graduate studies in art
1937 Alpha Alpha Gamma member: National Fraternity of Women in Architecture and its Allied Arts.
1932-1940 studied art at:
  Brooklyn Museum Art School/Institute
  New School For Social Research, (The New School)
  Pratt Institute of Art
  Art Students League of New York

1938-39 New York Zoological Society artist over 190 drawings for Zoological Park laboratory and in Bermuda
1961-62 Grenoble France - art classes still life and plein air 
1966 Vermont with Elfriede Abbe
1973 Boston Museum School of Fine Arts - student 
1972-76 HBS private art studio, Howard Street, Cambridge MA
1974-82 Cambridge Center for Adult Education - including engraving studio 
1977 Art Institute of Boston – student

Exhibitions 

Woodstock NY Art Association

Publications of work 

1939 Zoologica

Referenced in Publications 

1990 Pamphlet by Edward H. Bennett : A Letter to Harriet by Abby Rogers Clark 1925
1939 Annual report of the New York Zoological society
1973 Who's Who in American Art 1973
1999 Who Was Who in American Art 1564-1975 
2017 Asa Wright Nature Centre newsletter

References 

1914 births
1991 deaths
20th-century American women artists
American women painters
People from Glens Falls, New York
Cornell University alumni